MV Kurdistan was a  oil tanker built by Swan Hunter (Shipbuilders) Ltd. at the Hebburn Shipyard Tyne and Wear as the Frank D. Moores in June, 1973, renamed Kurdistan in 1976 and at the time of the accident was owned by the Nile Steamship Company Ltd.
She was a Liberian-registered tanker which broke in two spilling some 6,000 tons of Bunker c oil in the Cabot Strait off the coast of Cape Breton Nova Scotia Canada on 15 March 1979.
The amount of oil spilled is second only to the  spill off Canada's East Coast.

Accident
While on her way from Point Tupper, Nova Scotia to Sept-Iles, Quebec laden with 30,000 tons of Bunker c oil, Kurdistan encountered heavy pack ice around noon. After retreating from the ice field, several hours later, two cracks in her hull developed and the ship subsequently broke into two halves. The stern section was towed into Port Hastings, Nova Scotia where the remaining 16,000 tonnes of oil was off-loaded and was later towed to Europe. The section was retrofitted with a new hull and returned to service as the Simonburn in November of 1979.

References

External links 
 https://waves-vagues.dfo-mpo.gc.ca/Library/37168.pdf
 https://www.pfri.uniri.hr/web/en/projekti/aktivni/2017_-_MarStruFail_-1_eng.pdf
 https://response.restoration.noaa.gov/sites/default/files/Oil_Spill_Case_Histories.pdf
 https://www.twi-global.com/media-and-events/insights/m-v-kurdistan-tanker

Further reading
http://shipfax.blogspot.com/2019/03/kurdistan-remembered.html

Kurdistan
Kurdistan
Kurdistan
Maritime incidents in 1979